1173 Anchises  is an unusually elongated Jupiter Trojan from the Trojan camp, approximately  in diameter. It was discovered on 17 October 1930, by German astronomer Karl Reinmuth at the Heidelberg Observatory in southwest Germany, and was the 9th such body to be discovered. The primitive P-type asteroid belongs to the largest Jupiter trojans, has an unusually smooth surface texture, the lowest spectral slope of all members of the Trojan camp, and a rotation period of 11.6 hours. It was named after Anchises from Greek mythology.

Orbit and classification 

Anchises is a primitive Jovian asteroid orbiting in the trailing Trojan camp at Jupiter's  Lagrangian point, 60° behind its orbit in a 1:1 resonance . It is also a non-family asteroid of the Jovian background population.

It orbits the Sun at a distance of 4.6–6.0 AU once every 12 years and 2 months (4,451 days; semi-major axis of 5.3 AU). Its orbit has an eccentricity of 0.14 and an inclination of 7° with respect to the ecliptic. Up to the year 2200, its closest approach to any major planet will be on 3 February 2120, when it will still be  from Jupiter. The body's observation arc begins at Heidelberg with its official discovery observation in October 1930.

Naming 

This minor planet was named after Anchises from Greek mythology. He is the father of the Trojan hero Aeneas after whom 1172 Äneas was named. The official naming citation was mentioned in The Names of the Minor Planets by Paul Herget in 1955.

Physical characteristics 

In the Tholen classification, Anchises is a primitive P-type asteroid, a common spectral type among the Jupiter trojans. It has the lowest spectral slope (i.e. flattest spectral response curve, thus most neutral color) among all members of the Trojan camp. In the Barucci taxonomy, it has been characterized as a carbonaceous C-type asteroid (C0).

Rotation period 

In Summer 1986, the first photometric observations of Anchises were taken with the 0.9-meter telescope at the Cerro Tololo Observatory in Chile. Lightcurve analysis gave a well defined rotation period of 11.60 hours with a notably wide brightness variation of 0.57 magnitude.

Between January 2016, and December 2017, three more rotational lightcurves were obtained by American photometrist Robert Stephens at the Center for Solar System Studies in California. They gave a concurring period of 11.595, 11.596 and 11.599 hours with an amplitude between 0.34 and 0.73 magnitude. A high brightness amplitude is indicative for a non-spherical, elongated shape (see below).

Diameter and albedo 

According to the surveys carried out by the Infrared Astronomical Satellite IRAS, the Japanese Akari satellite, the NEOWISE mission of NASA's Wide-field Infrared Survey Explorer, and astronomers revisiting the data from these three space-based telescopes, Anchises measures between 99.55 and 136 kilometers in diameter and its surface has an albedo between 0.0308 and 0.050. The Collaborative Asteroid Lightcurve Link adopts the results obtained by IRAS, that is an albedo of 0.0308 and a diameter of 126.27 kilometers based on an absolute magnitude of 8.89.

This makes it the 7th largest Jupiter trojan only according to IRAS (126 km), and would be at least 6th should the size indeed prove to be 136 km or more, while it is much smaller and a few places further down the list according to the NEOWISE survey catalog (<100 km). One of the reasons for the large discrepancies in diameter estimates is possibly related to the results being derived from single-epoch observations of the asteroid, which is known for its large brightness variations (see above).

Shape and surface 

In 2012, an international collaboration revisited the WISE, IRAS and Akari observational data. Due to a small phase coefficient and a lack of any noticeable opposition effect, astronomers at Cerro Tololo concluded that this Jupiter trojan asteroid possesses an unusually smooth surface texture – far less rough than the great majority of asteroids. In case the surface of Anchises consist of bare rock, with high thermal inertia, the body's true diameter could be significantly greater than the estimated 136 kilometers, the study concludes.

Notes

References

External links 
 Asteroid Lightcurve Database (LCDB), query form (info )
 Dictionary of Minor Planet Names, Google books
 Discovery Circumstances: Numbered Minor Planets (1)-(5000) – Minor Planet Center
 
 

001173
Discoveries by Karl Wilhelm Reinmuth
Named minor planets
001173
19301017